Nancy Kelly may refer to:
Nancy Kelly (March 25, 1921 – January 2, 1995) an American actress.
Nancy Kelly (jazz singer)  (born October 12, 1950) an American jazz singer.
Nancy Kelly, a homeopath, founder of Homeopaths Without Borders.